Jerry Glenn "J. J." Jones (born June 7, 1978) is a former American football linebacker who played for the New Orleans Saints of the National Football League (NFL). He played college football at University of Arkansas.

Jones began his pro career in 2001 as an undrafted free agent in Dallas Cowboys training camp. On January 16, 2002, he signed with the New Orleans Saints. In 13 games, Jones had six tackles (five solo). On April 26, 2003, Jones left the Saints on an injury settlement.

In 2004, Jones played in nine games with seven starts for the Scottish Claymores of NFL Europe. He had five tackles and a pass defended.

References 

1978 births
Living people
Sportspeople from Little Rock, Arkansas
Players of American football from Arkansas
American football linebackers
Arkansas Razorbacks football players
New Orleans Saints players
Scottish Claymores players
People from Magnolia, Arkansas